Sultanmakhmut Toraygirov (29 October 1893 − 21 May 1920) was a prominent Kazakh writer and poet. He was born in Kyzyl Tau (near the city of Kokshetau) but moved to Bayanaul in the province of Pavlodar at the age of four. Toraygirov wrote his first poems when only 13 years old. From 1913 on, he was the sub-editor for the first Kazakh journal Aikap. In 1914 and 1915 he worked as a teacher in Bayanaul. In 1916 Toraygirov moved to Tomsk in Russia, but the next year the February Revolution made him return to Semey, in Kazakhstan. During this time he developed his style and wrote prolifically.

Toraygirov released several poem collections and his novel Beauty Kamar, released posthumously in 1933, was one of the first Kazakh language novels. He was very active politically, advocating both Kazakh national interests and the new Soviet ideals. Toraygirov died in 1920 at the age of 26.

The state university in Pavlodar and lake Toraigyr are named after Toraygirov.

Notable works 
 Poem Life in Confusion published in 1922
 Poem Poor man published in 1922
 Novel Beauty Kamar published in 1933

Poems 
 What is the purpose of study?
 Religion
 Education
 Blind Monk
 Sarybas (1913—1914)
 Fate
 Ayt
 Summer Camp()
 Poverty
 Belief in God
 Speckled Khoja

External links 
 Biography of Sultanmahmut Toraygirov in Russian

Kazakh-language poets
Kazakh-language writers
Kazakhstani Muslims
People from Akmola Region
1893 births
1920 deaths
20th-century poets
Soviet writers
Writers from the Russian Empire